Tragedy on the Line is a 1931 detective novel  by John Rhode, the pen name of the British writer Cecil Street. It is the tenth in his long-running series of novels featuring Lancelot Priestley, a Golden Age armchair detective who works alongside the less sharp-witted Superintendent Hanslet of Scotland Yard. It was published in the United States the same year by Dodd Mead.

Synopsis
The wealthy Gervase Wickenden is found dead on the railway line near Upton Bishop's station. Decapitated it is at first assumed he was killed by a train, until a bullet is discovered in a nearby tree. Added to this was the suspicious fact that he had changed his will only two days before, and both the old and the new version are now missing.

References

Bibliography
 Evans, Curtis. Masters of the "Humdrum" Mystery: Cecil John Charles Street, Freeman Wills Crofts, Alfred Walter Stewart and the British Detective Novel, 1920-1961. McFarland, 2014.
 Herbert, Rosemary. Whodunit?: A Who's Who in Crime & Mystery Writing. Oxford University Press, 2003.
 Reilly, John M. Twentieth Century Crime & Mystery Writers. Springer, 2015.

1931 British novels
Novels by Cecil Street
British crime novels
British mystery novels
British detective novels
Collins Crime Club books
Novels set in London